Stefano Costantini (born 24 May 1983) is an Italian amateur racing driver currently competing in the FIA World Endurance Championship with AF Corse. He is the reigning champion of the GT World Challenge Europe Endurance Cup in the Pro-Am class.

Racing record

Racing career summary 

† As Costantini was a guest driver, he was ineligible to score points.* Season still in progress.

Complete GT World Challenge results

GT World Challenge Europe Endurance Cup 
(Races in bold indicate pole position) (Races in italics indicate fastest lap)

Complete Asian Le Mans Series results 
(key) (Races in bold indicate pole position) (Races in italics indicate fastest lap)

Complete FIA World Endurance Championship results 
(key) (Races in bold indicate pole position) (Races in italics indicate fastest lap)

References

External links 

 

1983 births
Living people
Italian racing drivers
Sportspeople from Rome
FIA World Endurance Championship drivers
24 Hours of Le Mans drivers
AF Corse drivers
Asian Le Mans Series drivers
International GT Open drivers
Blancpain Endurance Series drivers
Lamborghini Super Trofeo drivers
24H Series drivers
Ombra Racing drivers
Target Racing drivers